Mirhashem Hosseini (born 28 October 1998) is an Iranian taekwondo competitor. He won gold medals at the 2016 Asian championships, 2017 Universiade and 2018 Asian Games, placing second at the 2017 World Championships.

In 2016, he won the gold medal in the men's −58 kg event at the 2016 Asian Taekwondo Championships in Pasay, Philippines.
He has been licensed to compete in the Tokyo Olympics.

References 

Living people
1998 births
Iranian male taekwondo practitioners
Universiade medalists in taekwondo
Asian Games gold medalists for Iran
Asian Games medalists in taekwondo
Taekwondo practitioners at the 2018 Asian Games
Medalists at the 2018 Asian Games
Universiade gold medalists for Iran
Medalists at the 2017 Summer Universiade
Medalists at the 2019 Summer Universiade
World Taekwondo Championships medalists
Asian Taekwondo Championships medalists
Taekwondo practitioners at the 2020 Summer Olympics
Olympic taekwondo practitioners of Iran
People from Mianeh
20th-century Iranian people
21st-century Iranian people